Novopokrovsky (masculine), Novopokrovskaya (feminine), or Novopokrovskoye (neuter) is the name of several rural localities in Russia:
Novopokrovsky, Novosibirsk Oblast, a settlement in Krasnozyorsky District of Novosibirsk Oblast
Novopokrovsky, name of several other rural localities
Novopokrovskaya, a stanitsa in Novopokrovsky District of Krasnodar Krai
Novopokrovskoye, Moscow Oblast, a village in Kolomensky District of Moscow Oblast
Novopokrovskoye, name of several other rural localities